Engin Çınar (born May 25, 1954) is a Turkish former footballer who played as a forward most notably in the Süper Lig, and North American Soccer League.

Career 
Çınar played in the TFF First League in 1972 with Trabzonspor. The following season he assisted in securing promotion to the Süper Lig after winning the league title. In 1975, he secured the Super Lig title with Trabzonspor which clinched a position in the 1976–77 European Cup. He featured in the 1976–77 European Cup tournament and played against Liverpool F.C., and recorded a goal against IA Akranes. In 1977, he signed with Galatasaray S.K., but shortly was sent to play with Beşiktaş J.K.

In 1979, he played with Diyarbakır F.K. In 1981, he played abroad in the National Soccer League with Toronto Panhellenic. In the winter of 1981 he played in the North American Soccer League indoor season with New York Cosmos. He later played in the Major Indoor Soccer League with Kansas City Comets.

References 

1954 births
Living people
Turkish footballers
Trabzonspor footballers
Galatasaray S.K. footballers
Beşiktaş J.K. footballers
Diyarbakırspor footballers
New York Cosmos players
Kansas City Comets (original MISL) players
TFF First League players
Süper Lig players
Canadian National Soccer League players
North American Soccer League (1968–1984) indoor players
Major Indoor Soccer League (1978–1992) players
Association football forwards
Turkish expatriate footballers
Expatriate soccer players in Canada
Turkish expatriate sportspeople in Canada
Expatriate soccer players in the United States
Turkish expatriate sportspeople in the United States